Thibaudylla is a genus of springtails in the family Hypogastruridae. There are at least four described species in Thibaudylla.

Species
These four species belong to the genus Thibaudylla:
 Thibaudylla anniae (Najt & Weiner, 1991) i c g
 Thibaudylla danieleae (Deharveng & Najt in Tillier, 1988) i c g
 Thibaudylla palpata (Deharveng & Najt in Tillier, 1988) i c g
 Thibaudylla thibaudi (Massoud, 1965) i c g
Data sources: i = ITIS, c = Catalogue of Life, g = GBIF, b = Bugguide.net

References

Further reading

 
 
 

Collembola